Sergey Semyonovich Nametkin (– 5 August 1950) was a Russian organic chemist, a prominent researcher in terpene chemistry, the cracking of petrochemicals, and rearrangement of camphenes.

Biography 
Nametkin was born in Kazan and orphaned at an early age. He was educated at a gymnasium in Moscow, after which he earned a living as a private tutor. He studied chemistry and became a lecturer in organic chemistry at the Moscow University but quit in 1911 to oppose the policies of L.A. Kasso. He then studied under N.D. Zelinsky, and received a doctorate in 1917. In 1927 he went to the Moscow Mining Academy and became a director of the Institute of Petroleum in 1948.

Nametkin rearrangement
The Nametkin rearrangement is the shift of a methyl group in this scheme and called the 'Nametkin' step. The shift of the ring bond is actually a standard Wagner-Meerwein shift. The reaction can in fact be used to make the terpene, using chlorocamphene.

A museum of petrochemistry was started in 2011 and named after S.S. Nametkin.

References

1876 births
1950 deaths
People from Vysokogorsky District
People from Kazansky Uyezd
Chemists from the Russian Empire
Inventors from the Russian Empire
Full Members of the USSR Academy of Sciences
Stalin Prize winners
Recipients of the Order of Lenin
Recipients of the Order of the Red Banner of Labour
Soviet chemists
Soviet inventors